Bressal mac Ailello Thassaig was an early king of the Uí Liatháin who may also have been King of Munster. His sister, Angias, was the Queen of Lóegaire mac Néill, High King of Ireland.

He was the son of Ailill Tassach, ancestor of the Uí Thassaig, an important sept of the Uí Liatháin.

Notes

References

 Francis John Byrne. Irish Kings and High-Kings. Four Courts Press. 2nd revised edition, 2001.
 Geoffrey Keating, with David Comyn and Patrick S. Dinneen (trs.), The History of Ireland by Geoffrey Keating. 4 Vols. London: David Nutt for the Irish Texts Society. 1902–14. Hosted elsewhere: The Keating Genealogies
 Michael A. O'Brien (ed.) with intr. by John V. Kelleher, Corpus genealogiarum Hiberniae. Dublin Institute for Advanced Studies. 1976. / partial digital edition: Donnchadh Ó Corráin (ed.), Genealogies from Rawlinson B 502. University College, Cork: Corpus of Electronic Texts. 1997.
 Whitley Stokes (ed. & tr.). The Tripartite Life of Patrick. London: Eyre and Spottiswoode for Her Majesty's Stationery Office. 1887.

Kings of Munster
Year of death unknown
5th-century Irish monarchs
Year of birth unknown